Strong Feelings is the third studio album by country musician Doug Paisley. It was released in January 2014 under No Quarter Records.

Track listing

References

2014 albums
Doug Paisley albums